Bicyclus nobilis, the noble bush brown, is a butterfly in the family Nymphalidae. It is found in Guinea, Sierra Leone, Liberia, Ivory Coast, Ghana, Nigeria, Cameroon, Gabon and the Republic of the Congo. The habitat consists of wetter forests of good quality.

References

Elymniini
Butterflies described in 1893
Butterflies of Africa